"Walk Hand in Hand" is a popular song by Johnny Cowell, published in 1956.

The biggest-selling version recorded of the song was sung by Tony Martin, reaching number 2 in the UK Singles Chart and number 10 on the United States Billboard chart in 1956. The same year, it was recorded by Andy Williams, whose version hit number 54 on the chart, and by Ronnie Carroll, whose version reached number 13 on the UK chart. A later recording by Gerry & The Pacemakers reached number 29 on the UK chart, number 10 in Canada, and "bubbled under" at number 103 on the Billboard chart at the end of 1965.

Recorded versions
Tony Martin (1956)
Andy Williams (1956)
Ronnie Carroll (1956)
Gerry & The Pacemakers (1965)
Engelbert Humperdinck
Twin Cities Gay Men's Chorus (1995)

References

1956 singles
Gerry and the Pacemakers songs
Andy Williams songs
Song recordings produced by George Martin
RCA Victor singles
1956 songs
Songs written by Johnny Cowell